Ishem Boumaraf is an Algerian singer-songwriter of chaouie music. He was born in Batna and he is Originally from T'Kout. Ishem was an ex-member of the musical group Tafert. He was alumnus and at the real time a Professor of the regional institute of musical education of Batna.

Biography 
In 2006 Ishem and regional institute of musical education of Batna created the musical group Tafert (Who's translated from chaoui as the challenge). Together released their first album Susa. Their style is a mix of Celtic, rock, reggae, Gnawa and chaouie music.

In 2011 he released his solo album Zazza, inspired by a true story of a young and pretty girl who lost her father murdered in an ambush in the Aures.

In 2014 he released his third album titled Baba Hfouda, in which he pays tribute to the stone masons of T'kout.

Discography 
 2006 — Susa
 2011 — Zazza
 2014 — Baba Hfouda

References

1978 births
Chaoui people
Living people
21st-century Algerian male  singers
People from Batna, Algeria